Peace House was founded in New York City in 1923 by Edith Clare Bryce Cram.

History 
It was founded in New York City in 1923 by Edith Clare Bryce Cram.

The building was an example of neoclassical architecture and it was designed by Frederick Fillmore French.

From 1950 to 1958 the building was used as a television studio by the US network CBS.

References 

Neoclassical architecture in New York City
1923 establishments in New York City